Vedurukuppam is a village in Chittoor district of the Indian state of Andhra Pradesh. It is the mandal headquarters of Vedurkuppam mandal.

References 

Villages in Chittoor district
Mandal headquarters in Chittoor district